Varicoglandina is a genus of predatory air-breathing land snails, terrestrial pulmonate gastropod mollusks in the family Spiraxidae.

Distribution 
The distribution of the genus Varicoglandina includes Mexico and Guatemala.

Species 
There are five species in the genus Varicoglandina:

 Varicoglandina constricta (Thompson, 1995)
 Varicoglandina monilifera (Pfeiffer, 1845)
 Varicoglandina monilifera rubella (Morelet, 1849)
 Varicoglandina nana (Shuttleworth, 1852)
 Varicoglandina rubiginosa (Thompson, 1995)
 Varicoglandina stigmatica (Shuttleworth, 1852)

References 

Spiraxidae